Frederick August Otto Schwarz (October 18, 1836 – May 17, 1911) was a German-born American toy retailer known for founding FAO Schwarz.

Biography
Schwarz was born to a German Lutheran family in 1836 at Herford, Province of Westphalia, Kingdom of Prussia and immigrated to the United States in 1856 with his three brothers, Henry, Richard, and Gustav. He worked for a Baltimore stationery importer. In an effort to increase their exports, German exporters occasionally combined stationery with toys and other goods. Toys that Schwarz displayed in the window of the store outsold stationery. By 1862 he had switched to selling the toys from his own shop, and in 1870 he moved his business to Manhattan in New York City. He married Caroline Clausen (1841–1904). Together they had four sons and three daughters: Anna Schwarz (1863–?), Ida Schwarz (1864-1942), Henry Schwarz, George Frederick Schwarz (1868–1931), Emilie Schwarz (1870–1958), H. Marshall Schwarz, and Herbert Ferlando Schwarz (1883–1960).
Frederick August Otto Schwarz died at his home in Manhattan at 20 East 61st Street.  Schwarz is buried in Green-Wood Cemetery.

Frederick August Otto Schwarz Jr. is his great grandson.

References

External links
 

1836 births
1911 deaths
Businesspeople from Baltimore
American businesspeople in retailing
Burials at Green-Wood Cemetery
People from Herford
Prussian emigrants to the United States
19th-century American businesspeople